Berndt Adolf Lindholm (20 August 1841 – 15 May 1914) was a Finnish landscape painter ( belonging to Swedish speaking population of Finland ). He is usually associated with the Düsseldorf School, but his work also displays early Impressionist elements. He specialized in coastal scenes.

Biography
He took his first drawing lessons from Johan Knutson in Porvoo. From 1856 to 1861, he attended the drawing school of the Finnish Art Society in Turku, where he studied with Robert Wilhelm Ekman. From 1863 to 1865, he attended the Kunstakademie Düsseldorf then went to the Academy of Arts in Karlsruhe for one year to continue his studies with Hans Gude.

His first solo exhibition (Helsinki, 1870) was successful and, three years later, he was invited to become a member of the Imperial Academy of Arts.

From 1873 to 1874, he was in Paris, where his teachers included Léon Bonnat. He also came under the influence of Charles-François Daubigny and the Barbizon school. In 1876, he was awarded a medal at the Centennial Exposition in Philadelphia and received the Finnish State Prize the following year.

That same year he settled in Gothenburg and became Curator of the city art collection in 1878; a position he held until 1900. He also taught at the Valand Academy and was elected to the Royal Swedish Academy of Arts. In addition to his painting, he provided illustrations for several works by Zacharias Topelius.

His work is represented at the Nationalmuseum in Stockholm, the Turku Art Museum, Åbo Akademi University and the Gothenburg Art Museum and at museums in Norrköping and Vänersborg.

Selected paintings

See also
 Finnish art

References

Further reading
Jüri Kokkonen, Brita Löflund: Berndt Lindholm (exhibition catalog) Åbo konstmuseum, 1995

External links

ArtNet: More works by Lindholm
Kansallisgalleria: More works by Lindholm

1841 births
1914 deaths
People from Loviisa
Finnish male painters
19th-century Finnish painters
20th-century Finnish painters
Landscape painters
Kunstakademie Düsseldorf alumni
Finnish emigrants to Sweden
Academic staff of the University of Gothenburg
People from Gothenburg
19th-century Swedish painters
20th-century Swedish painters
Swedish male painters
Swedish-speaking Finns
19th-century Swedish male artists
20th-century Swedish male artists
19th-century Finnish male artists
20th-century Finnish male artists